In the United States Marine Corps, the aviation combat element or air combat element (ACE) is the aviation component of the Marine Air-Ground Task Force (MAGTF). The ACE is task organized to perform the six functions of Marine Corps aviation in support of MAGTF operations.  The ACE is led by an aviation headquarters which employs rotary-wing, tiltrotor, and fixed-wing aircraft in conjunction with command and control, maintenance and engineering units.   



Role within the MAGTF
The majority of aircraft usage within the MAGTF is for close air support or transport for the ground combat element (GCE) or logistics combat element (LCE), however, other specialized missions are available. The six main functions include: assault support, anti-air warfare, offensive air support, electronic warfare, control of aircraft and missiles, and aerial reconnaissance.

The aviation combat element (ACE), which contributes the air power to the MAGTF, includes all aircraft (fixed wing, helicopters, tiltrotor, and UAV) and aviation support units. The units are organized into detachments, squadrons, groups, and wings, except for low altitude air defense units, which are organized into platoons, detachments, batteries, and battalions. These units include pilots, flight officers, enlisted aircrewmen, aviation logistics (aircraft maintenance, aviation electronics, aviation ordnance, and aviation supply) and Navy aviation medical and chaplain's corps personnel, as well as ground-based air defense units, and those units necessary for command and control (management and planning for manpower, intelligence, operations and training, and logistics functions), aviation command and control (tactical air command, air defense control, air support control, and air traffic control), communications, and aviation ground support (e.g., airfield services, bulk fuels/aircraft refueling, crash rescue, engineer construction and utilities support, EOD, motor transport, ground equipment supply and maintenance, local security/law enforcement, and the wing band).

ACE Organization and size
The size of the ACE varies in proportion to the size of the MAGTF. A Marine Expeditionary Force has a Marine Aircraft Wing or MAW. A Marine Expeditionary Brigade holds a Marine Aircraft Group or MAG, reinforced with a variety of aircraft squadrons and support personnel. The various Marine Expeditionary Units command a reinforced squadron, with various types of aircraft mixed into a single unit (known as a composite squadron).
Generally, MEF postings are permanent, while MEBs and MEUs rotate their ACE, GCE, and LCE twice annually. 1st and 3rd Marine Aircraft Wings are unique in that they are subordinate to III MEF and I MEF, respectively, while all other equivalent units numerical designators match the MEF to which attached.

Hierarchy of Marine Aviation units



Marine Aircraft Group 12

Marine Aircraft Group 24

Marine Aircraft Group 36

Marine Air Control Group 18



Marine Aircraft Group 14

Marine Aircraft Group 26

Marine Aircraft Group 29

Marine Aircraft Group 31

Marine Air Control Group 28



Marine Aircraft Group 11

Marine Aircraft Group 13

Marine Aircraft Group 16

Marine Aircraft Group 39

Marine Air Control Group 38



Marine Aircraft Group 41

Marine Aircraft Group 49

Marine Air Control Group 48

See also
 Marine Air-Ground Task Force
 United States Marine Corps Aviation
 List of United States Marine Corps aircraft wings
 List of United States Marine Corps aircraft groups
 List of active United States Marine Corps aircraft squadrons
 List of inactive United States Marine Corps aircraft squadrons
 List of United States Marine Corps aviation support units

References

United States Marine Corps aviation
United States Marine Corps organization